Scott Humphries defeated Mark Philippoussis in the final, 7–6(7–5), 3–6, 6–4 to win the boys' singles tennis title at the 1994 Wimbledon Championships.

Seeds

  Nicolás Lapentti (first round)
  Ben Ellwood (quarterfinals)
  Mark Philippoussis (final)
  Eyal Erlich (second round)
  Federico Browne (third round)
 n/a
  Andrew Ilie (second round)
  Gustavo Kuerten (first round)
  Alejandro Hernández (third round)
  Giorgio Galimberti (third round)
  Scott Humphries (champion)
  Ramón Delgado (first round)
  Paul Goldstein (quarterfinals)
  James Sekulov (third round)
 n/a
  Mehdi Tahiri (quarterfinals)

Draw

Finals

Top half

Section 1

Section 2

Bottom half

Section 3

Section 4

References

External links

Boys' Singles
Wimbledon Championship by year – Boys' singles